Norfolkia brachylepis, known commonly as the tropical scaly-headed triplefin, is a species of triplefin blenny in the genus Norfolkia. It was described by Leonard Schultz in 1960. This is an Indo-Pacific species which is distributed from the Red Sea to Fiji, north to the Izu Islands and south to Australia.

References

Tropical scaly-headed triplefin
Fish described in 1960